Marcel Vallée (15 January 1880, in Paris – 31 October 1957, in Fontaine-le-Port) was a French actor, primarily of the theater.  He began working in films with Max Linder in 1906. He appeared in some American films.

Selected filmography
 My Aunt from Honfleur (1923)
 The Mystery of the Yellow Room (1930)
 The Girl and the Boy (1931)
 Alone (1931)
 The Night at the Hotel (1932)
 Nights in Port Said (1932)
 A Star Disappears (1932)
 The Champion Cook (1932)
 Topaze (1933)
 The Little King (1933)
 Judex (1934)
 Song of Farewell (1934)
 Divine (1935)
 Miarka (1937)
 The Man from Nowhere (1937)
 Beautiful Star (1938)
 His Uncle from Normandy (1939)
 Whirlwind of Paris (1939)
 Serenade (1940)
 The Blue Veil (1942)
 Madly in Love (1943)
 The Midnight Sun (1943)
 The Ideal Couple (1946)
 That's Not the Way to Die (1946)
 Rooster Heart (1946)
 Rendezvous in Paris (1947)
 The Ironmaster (1948)
 Night Round (1949)
 Branquignol (1949)
 Topaze (1951)
 The Red Head (1952)
 When Do You Commit Suicide? (1953)

References

1880 births
1957 deaths
French male film actors
French male stage actors
French male silent film actors
20th-century French male actors
French expatriates in the United States